Carl Georg Friedrich Wilhelm Flügge (12 September 1847 – 10 December 1923) was a German bacteriologist and hygienist. His finding that pathogens were present in expiratory droplets, the eponymous Flügge droplets, laid ground for the concept of droplet transmission as a route for the spread of respiratory infectious diseases.

Early life and education 
Originally from Hanover, Carl Georg Friedrich Wilhelm Flügge studied medicine in Göttingen, Bonn, Leipzig and Munich. In 1878 he taught hygiene in Berlin. In 1881, he became holder of the first chair of hygiene at the University of Göttingen, then professor at the universities of Breslau and Berlin, where he succeeded Max Rubner (1854-1932) in the department of hygiene.

Flügge was a colleague of microbiologist Robert Koch (1843-1910), with whom he co-edited the journal Zeitschrift für Hygiene und Infektionskrankheiten.
Two of his best-known assistants in Breslau were Wolfgang Weichardt (1875-1943) and Walther Kruse (1864-1943).

Career
In 1881 Flügge became the first chair of hygiene at the University of Göttingen, and afterwards a professor at the Universities of Breslau and Berlin, where he succeeded Max Rubner at the Department of Hygiene. 

Flügge was a colleague of microbiologist Robert Koch, with whom he co-edited the journal Zeitschrift für Hygiene und Infektionskrankheiten. Two of his better-known assistants at Breslau were Wolfgang Weichardt (1875–1943) and Walther Kruse (1864–1943).

Work 
Carl Flügge was known for advocating for hygiene as an independent medical discipline, and he is recognized for his extensive research into the transmission of infectious diseases such as malaria, tuberculosis and cholera.

In the 1890s, he demonstrated that even during simple speech, tiny droplets (Flügge droplets) were propelled into the air. 
This discovery was instrumental in advocating the use of surgical gauze masks by Jan Mikulicz-Radecki (1850–1905) in 18974,5.

Legacy
Flügge is known for advocating hygiene as an independent medical discipline, and is remembered for performing extensive research involving the transmission of infectious diseases such as malaria, tuberculosis and cholera.  
In the 1890s, he demonstrated that even during "quiet speech", minute droplets, the Flügge droplets are sprayed into the air. This laid ground to the concept of droplet transmission, still in use in the 21 st century. The finding was instrumental in Jan Mikulicz-Radecki's advocacy of surgical gauze masks in 1897.

Publications
Among his publications are two important books on hygiene:
 
 
Other works include:
 
  Part 1; Part 2.
Articles include:
Die Verbreitung der Phthise durch staubförmiges Sputum und durch beim Husten verspritzte Tröpfchen. Zeitschrift für Hygiene und Infektionskrankheiten volume 30, pages 107–124 (1899)

References

Bibliography

 Lehrbuch der hygienischen Untersuchungsmethoden
 The Gospel of Germs: Men, Women, and the Microbe in American Life
 
 

German microbiologists
Hygienists
1847 births
1923 deaths
Academic staff of the University of Göttingen
Academic staff of the Humboldt University of Berlin
Academic staff of the University of Breslau
Medical Microbiology and Immunology editors